The prime minister of the Philippines was the official designation of the head of the government (whereas the president of the Philippines was the head of state) of the Philippines from 1978 until the People Power Revolution in 1986. During martial law and the fourth republic, the prime minister served as the head the Armed Forces of the Philippines. A limited version of this office, officially known as the President of the Council of Government, existed temporarily in 1899 during the First Philippine Republic.

Salvador Laurel served as the last prime minister of the Philippines and later served as the vice president of the Philippines from 1986 to 1992.

History

First creation (1899) 

The 1899 Constitution of the Philippines created the office of the Council of Government which was composed of the President of the Council and seven secretaries. The president of the revolutionary government led by Emilio Aguinaldo, appointed his advisor Apolinario Mabini as the first President of the Council of Government through a decree issued January 2, 1899. Mabini also became the finance minister of the Republic. The President of the Council was de facto equivalent to a prime minister.

On December 10, 1898, the ongoing war between United States and Spain was concluded with Spain giving up all rights to Cuba and surrendering the Philippines, Guam and Puerto Rico to the United States. Two days later, Aguinaldo ordered his lawyer Felipe Agoncillo to contest the Philippine status as an independent nation and no longer a Spanish colony since the declaration of independence on June 12, 1898. The United States did not recognize Philippine sovereignty. This led to serious conflict when the insurgent Philippine Republic was formally established on January 23, 1899 at Malolos. By January 30, Aguinaldo had again dispatched Agoncillo, this time to the United States Senate, to lobby them to reconsider their plans and instead formally recognize Filipino independence.

In the next few months, Mabini was pressured by political problems such as negotiating to end the hostilities between Filipinos and American forces left in the Philippines after the war. After the failure to reach successful agreements with the U.S. army to secure a cease fire, the first shot of the Philippine–American War erupted on February 4, 1899. The revolutionary government was forced to vacate Malolos and transfer the seat of administration from place to place. Mabini, who was pressured then from his political adversaries and failure to stop the increasing guerilla insurgency during the war, left the post and surrendered to United States on May 7, 1899.

One of the political adversaries who forced Mabini to leave office was Pedro A. Paterno, president of the Congress of the Republic since September 15, 1898. He opposed Mabini's offensive plan to counter United States attacks during the war, so he proposed peace plans with the Americans to Aguinaldo, such that the Philippines would be a protectorate of the United States with full autonomy. This was opposed by Mabini, however, Paterno and his allies convinced Aguinaldo to dissolve the Mabini cabinet.

The next day, May 8, Aguinaldo appointed Paterno as the President of the Council of Government.  One of his first moves during his term was to draft a copy of "Autonomy Plan" to the Schurman Commission which asks for peace settlement with the US government. This also states that the Filipinos are ready to drop the idea of independence and accept US sovereignty over the archipelago.

Meanwhile, the takeover by Paterno of the revolutionary government and his actions towards the Schurman Commission infuriated General Antonio Luna, the commanding officer of the Philippine Army. He ordered to arrest Paterno and other members of the Cabinet, however, he was unsuccessful to send Paterno to jail. Due to his actions, Paterno was forced to write a manifesto on June 2, 1899, stating a formal declaration of war against the United States. On June 5, Luna was assassinated in Nueva Ecija, one of the alleged reasons for his murder was due to this conflict with Paterno.

During the war, the seat of Aguinaldo changed from place to place northwards as the Americans grew aggressive. On November 13, 1899, Paterno was captured by US forces in Benguet, thus ending his term as the President of the Council. Aguinaldo, however, did not appoint a successor for Paterno as he was busy for fleeing the Republic. On June 21, 1900, Paterno, as prisoner of war, accepted amnesty granted by the military governor General Arthur MacArthur, Jr. and he finally swore allegiance to the United States together with other members of Aguinaldo government.

From 1899 to 1901, Philippines was headed by American military governors. When Aguinaldo was captured by Gen. Frederick Funston on March 23, 1901 at Palanan, Isabela, the country was headed then by civil governors until the formal establishment of self-autonomous Commonwealth on November 15, 1935. The 1935 Constitution that describes the operation of the Commonwealth does not have the provision of reviving the office of the President of the Council of the Government or creating any related position. This was continued until the Third Republic.

Second creation (1978–1986)

In 1976, President Ferdinand Marcos issued Presidential Decrees 991 and 1033 calling for a constitutional referendum, set on October 16, 1976. The voters were asked whether they wanted to lift the ongoing martial law since 1972; the majority approved its continuation. In addition, drafted and ratified was the Sixth Amendment to the 1973 Constitution, which fused legislative and executive powers in the office of President. One of its provisions at the time of ratification was that the President shall obtain the title of Prime Minister, thus re-creating the office after 1899. Marcos, who concurrently as president, continued to wield the powers vested in the President by the 1935 Constitution. The Amendment also created the unicameral legislature known as the Interim Batasang Pambansa (Interim National Assembly or IBP), as well as a provision such that the President/Prime Minister will exercise legislative powers until martial law is lifted.

On April 7, 1978, the first election for the Batasang Pambansa, was held since the abolition of the bicameral Congress under the 1973 Constitution. 150 out of 165 elected positions of the parliament were dominated by Marcos' ruling party, the Kilusang Bagong Lipunan (New Society Movement). By June 12, the IBP was inaugurated which also confirmed Marcos' position as the Prime Minister of the Philippines.

Upon his inauguration for a third presidential term on June 30, 1981, Marcos formally relinquished his powers as Prime Minister. He appointed then-Finance Minister Cesar Virata to succeed him to the post during the opening of the fourth regular session of the IBP on July 27, 1981. Virata, a grand-nephew of former President Emilio Aguinaldo,  previously represented the country to World Bank's Council of Governors. Until the 1986 People Power Revolution, Virata held this position. It was conjectured that Marcos bestowed his Prime Ministerial post to Virata because of the latter's distance from mainstream politics. Other than being Marcos' finance minister, Virata was not a political threat.

Abolition
Upon her accession in late February 1986, Corazon Aquino appointed her Vice President and running mate Salvador Laurel to succeed Virata under her revolutionary government. However, the premiership was later abolished in March 1986 with the release of Proclamation No. 3, or the "Freedom Constitution".

The subsequent and currently-enforced 1987 Constitution has no provisions for such a position, as the President is now both head of government and head of state.

Powers and duties

The office of the President of the Council of Government was created by 1899 Constitution of the Philippines on Title IX, with the role as the head of secretaries to the President of the Republic. The first President of the Council was Apolinario Mabini, who also happened to be the concurrent Minister of Foreign Affairs. The President of the Council is equivalent to present-day Prime Minister, having the management of the day-to-day operations of the government.

The 1973 Constitution provided clear powers and duties of the Prime Minister starting at the administration of Ferdinand E. Marcos. Article IX, section 3 of the 1973 Constitution describes the primary qualification of an individual to become the Prime Minister: he must be a member of the Interim Batasang Pambansa (National Assembly). To become a member of the Interim Batasang Pambansa, one must be a qualified citizen of the Republic and was elected by the popular district in which he will represent at the assembly. Though the appointment of the Prime Minister is exactly written on the Constitution, however, the Prime Minister is exempted from impeachment, thus paving way for whoever the Prime Minister will be, for an indefinite term.  On the same hand, the Prime Minister and his deputy may leave office at their own will. However, the same as in other Parliaments , the Batasang Pambansa (National Assembly) may withdraw its confidence from the Prime Minister only by electing a successor by a majority vote of all its Members. 

Apart being the head of government, the Prime Minister also presides over his Cabinet. He has the power to appoint Cabinet members, often from the National Assembly. Likewise, he also has the prerogative to remove them at his discretion.

He also has the following powers and duties:
 Appoint the Deputy Prime Minister that will have powers vested by the Prime Minister;
 Present the program and state of the government to the National Assembly at the start of each regular session;
 Control all ministries provided by the law;
 Head the Armed Forces of the Philippines as their commander-in-chief;
 Appoint the heads of government bureaus and offices, and promote brigadier-generals and commodores of the Armed Forces;
 Grant reprieves, commutations, and pardons; remit fines and forfeitures after final conviction; and grant amnesties with the permission of the National Assembly, except at the time of impeachment; and
 Guarantee foreign and local loans of the Republic.

In Section 16, it was also mentioned that all powers previously vested by the 1935 Constitution of the Philippines to the President of the Republic shall be transferred to the Prime Minister unless the National Assembly provides those. This includes the power of the Prime Minister to sign and create treaties and foreign agreements as well as appointment of ambassadors and consuls with the permission of the Commission on Appointments.

However, upon the amendments to the 1973 Constitution in 1981, which created a so-called modified parliamentary form of government, which has some sorts of semi-presidentialism, to be patterned after that in Peru, most of the executive powers held by the Prime Minister were restored to the President, who would be directly elected by the people and has complete control over the ministries as chief executive, the one that would determine the national and foreign policies of the country and who commands the armed forces. The President retains the right to issue decrees with the force of law at any time pursuant to Amendment No. 6 to the said Constitution, ratified in 1976. The prime minister was still retained as the head of the Cabinet, but his power was relegated to supervising the ministries. He or she will be elected by the majority of all the members of the Batasang Pambansa, then the country's unicameral parliamentary legislature, upon nomination of the President. The prime minister is responsible, alongside the Cabinet, before the Batasang Pambansa for a program of government that has to be approved first by the President. 

Under Executive Order No. 708 issued on July 27, 1981, the powers of The prime minister were expanded, especially in relation to supervising such ministries. The prime minister was mandated to take charge and management of the day-to-day and details of administration of the government, to coordinate the activities of the ministries and to act on all matters delegated by the President without indicating the sentence, "By the Authority of the President." And in 1984, the Prime Minister was mandated also to head a Cabinet Standing Committee created to assist the President in his functions, whenever he may prescribe and as chairman of the committee, he was made as its executive officer to carry out its decisions and actions.

List of prime ministers

Timeline

Statistics
 Living former prime minister:
Cesar Virata (1981–1986) (born December 12, 1930) — 
 List of prime ministers by age at the start of term:
 Ferdinand Marcos — 
 Salvador Laurel — 
 Cesar Virata — 
 Pedro Paterno — 
 Apolinario Mabini — 
 List of prime ministers by tenure of office:
 Cesar Virata (1981–1986) — 
 Ferdinand Marcos (1978–1981) — 
 Apolinario Mabini (1899) — 
 Pedro Paterno (1899) — 
 Salvador Laurel (1986) —

See also
 List of sovereign state leaders in the Philippines
 Vice President of the Philippines

Notes

References

Citations

Notes

Bibliography
Government documents
 1899 Constitution of the Republic of the Philippines
 1935 Constitution of the Republic of the Philippines
 1973 Constitution of the Republic of the Philippines

Published works

 
  
  
  Digitally archived and reproduced at the University of Michigan Library, Ann Arbor, Michigan, United States since 2005.
 
 
  
 
  
  
  
 
  

Philippines, Prime Minister
Philippine Heads of State and Government
Prime Ministers